Electronic Warfare is a classic Underground Resistance release, which defined further developments and experiments in electro sound. It was released in double 12" format in 1996 under the catalog number #033.

Track listing
 A1 - "Logic Bomb"
 A2 - "Fiber Optic Commando (M.O.D.)"
 B1 - "Electronic Warfare (Vocal)"
 B2 - "Electronic Warfare (Instrumental)"
 B3 - "Electronic Warfare (Oz speaks)"
 C1 - "Biosensors In Tunnel Complex Africa"
 C2 - "Install 'Ho Chi Minh' Chip"
 D1 - "The Illuminator"

Officially released by the UR (Underground Resistance) collective. The members of UR are; Andre Holland, D-HA, DJ Rolando, Drexciya, Gerald Mitchell, Ghetto Tech, James Pennington, Mike Banks, Marc Floyd, Mark Taylor, Perception, Scan 7, Timeline,... But the tracks appeared on this release were mainly produced by "Mad" Mike Banks.

1996 albums